Elections in Hong Kong take place when certain political offices in the government need to be filled. Hong Kong has a multi-party system, with numerous parties in the Legislative Council. The Chief Executive of Hong Kong is nonpartisan but has to work with several parties to form a coalition government.

Every four years, ninety representatives are chosen to sit on the unicameral Legislative Council of Hong Kong (LegCo). Twenty seats representing the geographical constituencies are returned by popular vote, thirty seats representing the functional constituencies are elected through smaller closed elections within business sectors, and the remaining forty seats representing the Election Committee constituency are chosen by members of the Election Committee. The Chief Executive of Hong Kong is returned by the 1,500-member Election Committee on five-year intervals. Local elections are held on four-year intervals to return members of District Councils.
 
Following the 2019–2020 Hong Kong protests, and the landslide victory of Hong Kong's pro-democracy camp in the 2019 Hong Kong local elections, the Standing Committee of the National People's Congress of the People's Republic of China unilaterally passed the Hong Kong national security law and changes to Annex I and Annex II of the Hong Kong Basic Law. Pro-democracy activists are prevented from being able to participate in future elections and curtail the influence of the public's vote on the outcome.

History

Elections for unofficial members of the Urban Council were held since 1888. Suffrage was restricted to residents on the special and common jury lists between 1888 and 1973. In 1973, the electoral franchise for the Urban Council was widened to residents above 21 years of age who have lived in Hong Kong for at least three years that qualified in at least one of 23 specified categories, which included educational qualifications (School Certificate Examination or equivalent), being a juror, salaried taxpayer, or a member of certain professional organisations as listed in Schedule 1 of the Urban Council Ordinance (Cap. 101, Laws of Hong Kong). Half of the members of the Urban Council were elected, but by a minority of the population. It was estimated that in 1970 there were 250,000 eligible voters  and in 1981 the number had increased to 400,000 – 500,000. Prominent elected Urban Councilors included Elsie Tu and Brook Bernacchi of the Reform Club.

Expansion of elected offices 
The Green Paper: A Pattern of District Administration in Hong Kong was published on 6 June 1980 for public consultations on reforming local administration in Hong Kong. The Green Paper recommended that elections by popular vote be introduced to return some members of the newly-established District Boards and unofficial members of the Urban Council. The White Paper: District Administration in Hong Kong of January 1981 further cemented the government's will to introduce elections by popular vote. Proposals in the White Paper were implemented between 1982 and 1983, during which elections to the District Boards and Urban Council were held.

Months before the Sino-British Joint Declaration was signed which the United Kingdom and the People's Republic of China governments agreed on handing over Hong Kong from British to Chinese rule in 1997, the Green Paper: the Further Development of Representative Government in Hong Kong was published in July 1984. The Green Paper cemented first large-scale constitutional reform in developing a representative government during the British rule. The Green Paper suggested the introduction of indirect election in two stages in 1985 and 1988 to the unofficial members of the Legislative Council of Hong Kong (LegCo) by an electoral college consisting of Members of the Urban Council of Hong Kong, the new Regional Council to be established in 1986, and District Boards and functional groups or functional constituencies. The first Legislative Council elections, electing 24 unofficial members of LegCo, was held in September 1985.

Popular elections to the legislature 
Consultations on electoral reform followed the 1985 electoral reform. In the White Paper: the Further Development of Representative Government in Hong Kong of 1984, the idea of direct election was suggested to be reviewed in the development of representative government in 1987.

In May 1987, the government published the 1987 Green Paper: Review of Developments in Representative Government to consider the next stage of development of representative government. Despite strong public opinion in the consultations supporting the introduction of direct elections, the Government concluded that no clear consensus on the timing or the extent of the introduction of direct elections emerged. The subsequent White Paper: the Development of Representative Government: The Way Forward delayed the first direct elections to the Legislative Council from 1988 to the 1991 elections. 18 members were returned from geographical constituencies by popular vote, out of a total of 60 LegCo members.

As Chris Patten succeeded David Wilson as the last Governor of Hong Kong, extensive electoral reform proposals were announced in Patten’s inaugural Policy Address. The minimum voting age was lowered from 21 to 18, and all appointed seats on the Urban Council, Regional Council and District Boards were to be abolished by 1995. Single-member constituencies were to be introduced to geographical constituencies of the Legislative Council, elected seats of the Urban Council, elected seats of the Regional Council and elected seats of District Boards.

Patten significantly broadened the electoral franchise to the first fully-elected Legislative Council returned in 1995, the composition of which conformed with Basic Law provisions on the composition of the 1st Legislative Council of Hong Kong SAR. Patten lobbied the Legislative Council (Electoral Provisions) (Amendment) Bill 1994 which broadened the franchise of certain existing functional constituencies by replacing corporate voting with individual voting. 9 new functional constituency seats were established, allowing about 2.7 million people to have the right to vote in functional constituencies. An Election Committee composed of district Board members returned 10 members to the Legislative Council.

In response to Patten's reforms, Beijing cancelled the "through-train arrangement" allowing the last Legislative Council in the British-era to be sworn in as the 1st Legislative Council of Hong Kong SAR after the transfer of sovereignty to China in 1997. The Preparatory Committee for the Hong Kong SAR under Chinese National People's Congress established the Provisional Legislative Council on 26 January 1996 that served as Hong Kong's interim legislature until July 1998.

Post-handover development 
The Provisional Legislative Council (PLC) installed by the Beijing government during the intense Sino-British confrontation over the democratic reform decided on the electoral system of the post-handover Legislative Council. For geographical constituencies, proportional representation using the largest remainder method with Hare quota was adopted by the SAR government in replacement of the first-past-the-post system introduced in 1995. The system designed to reward the weaker pro-Beijing candidates and dilute the electoral strength of the majority democrats. For functional constituencies, corporate voting was restored after it was abolished in 1995. It reduced the number of eligible voters by almost 90 per cent, from over 1.1 million in 1995 to fewer than 140,000 in 1998. The elected Urban Council and Regional Council were also abolished by Tung Chee-hwa's government.

The first legislative election in the HKSAR was held in 1998, with 20 members returned by geographical constituencies through direct elections, 10 members returned by the 800-member Election Committee and 30 members returned by functional constituencies (FC). The number of LegCo members returned from geographical constituencies (GC) increased from 20 to 24 in 2000 and to 30 in 2004, constituting half of the legislature. Seats returned by Election Committee were abolished by 2004.

The first Chief Executive election after the transfer of sovereignty was held in 2002. Incumbent Tung Chee-hwa was elected uncontested. Subsequent Chief Executives were returned by the Election Committee, members of which were elected by members of specified associations or professions.

Demand for universal suffrage
Before the 2021 Hong Kong electoral changes, the Hong Kong Special Administrative Region had the power to initiate amendments of Annexes I and II of the Basic Law to change its electoral system. From late 2003 on, the Government and the public had been drawing out plans of democratisation to realise the ultimate aim of electing a chief executive by universal suffrage after nomination by an ad hoc committee (Basic Law, Art. 45) and electing the whole Legislative Council by universal suffrage (Basic Law, Art. 68). On 6 April 2004, the Standing Committee of the National People's Congress (NPCSC) issued its second interpretation on the Basic Law, indicating that electoral reforms are possible in 2007 and stipulating the “five steps” of initiating political reform under Annex I of the Basic Law. On 26 April 2004, the NPCSC further passed a decision that negated universal suffrage for CE elections in 2007 and LegCo elections in 2008, but provided for electoral reforms withstanding a 50:50 ratio between GC and FC seats. The Legislative Council vetoed the Motions put by the HKSAR Government to the LegCo concerning amendment to the methods for selecting the CE in 2007 and for forming LegCo.

In late 2007, the Standing Committee of the National People's Congress (NPCSC) decided that the universal suffrage for the Chief Executive can be achieved in 2017 or later, and universal suffrage for the Legislative Council can be achieved after the former has been. The NPCSC decision also provided for electoral reforms in 2012 withstanding a 50:50 ratio between GC and FC seats. The Legislative Council approved of the Motions concerning the amendment to the methods for selecting the CE and for forming LegCo in 2012.

Amidst the 2014–2015 Hong Kong electoral reform on universal suffrage in 2017, the NPCSC has outlined a screening mechanism of Chief Executive candidates, in which Chief Executive candidates must first receive nominations by an absolute majority of a Nominating Committee before proceeding to popular vote. The Hong Kong Government's bill for universal suffrage in Chief Executive elections was subsequently rejected.

With the NPCSC's amendment of Annexes I and II of the Basic Law in 2021, the NPCSC has retracted the power of the HKSAR to initiate political reform. The Chinese NPCSC now exercises the sole power to amend Annexes I and II of the Basic Law. In lieu of recent efforts by China to hamper the pro-democracy camp, universal suffrage remains unlikely.

The evolution of elected offices in Hong Kong returned by popular vote is as follows:

Voter registration and nomination
Any Hong Kong permanent resident aged 18 or above may register as an elector in the geographical constituency in which they reside, except those mentally incapacitated and those serving in an armed force. Persons serving a sentence of imprisonment used to be barred from registering and voting, but a 2008 judgment by the Court of First Instance of the High Court ruled that a blanket bar was unconstitutional and that the Government had a year to change the offending provisions. The Government did not appeal the judgment, and held consultations with the public on how the law should be changed. A bill was then introduced to the LegCo, providing that no person would be barred from electoral registration or voting because of criminal conviction, even for crimes against the electoral system. It became law and entered into force on 30 October 2009.

Hong Kong permanent residents must satisfy all the following requirements to be eligible for registration as electors in a geographical constituency:
 permanent resident of Hong Kong;
 aged 18 years or above as at 25 July next following his application for registration (or 25 September in a District Council election year)
 ordinarily resident in Hong Kong, and the residential address in his application for registration is his only or principal residence in Hong Kong;
 holds a Hong Kong identity document or has applied for a new identity card; and
 not disqualified by application of s.31 of the Legislative Council Ordinance (Cap 542).

Electors can run for elections if they have reached 21 years of age and have ordinary resided in Hong Kong for the 3 years immediately preceding the nomination. In addition, candidates running for the Chief Executive and the Legislative Council, except 12 specified functional constituencies have to be a Chinese citizen with no right of abode in any country other than the People’s Republic of China.

Candidate eligibility review 
Under the 2021 Hong Kong electoral changes initiated by the National People's Congress, nominees for elections are screened so as to ensure the "administration of Hong Kong by Hong Kong people with patriots as the main body". A Candidate Eligibility Review mechanism is established to review and confirm of eligibility of candidates for the Election Committee, Chief Executive and Legislative Council elections:
 Review by the department for safeguarding national security of the Hong Kong Police Force on whether a candidate meets the legal requirements and conditions of upholding the Basic Law and swearing allegiance to HKSAR of PRC;
 the Committee for Safeguarding National Security of the HKSAR issues opinion in respect of a candidate who fails to meet such legal requirements and conditions on the basis of the police review; and
 Review and Confirmation of eligibility of candidates by the Candidate Eligibility Review Committee of the HKSAR.

In practice, every candidate approved to run for election to the Legislative Council is either a member of the pro-Beijing camp or has otherwise been deemed "patriotic" enough by the government of China to participate. Since the 2021 reforms, numerous pro-democracy activists who had attempted to run in elections were arrested.

Chief Executive elections

The Election Committee is responsible for nomination of Chief Executive candidates and election of the Chief Executive-elect. Under the 2021 Hong Kong electoral changes initiated by the National People's Congress, each candidate running for Chief Executive elections is to be nominated by at least 188 members of the Election Committee, before their eligibility is reviewed and confirmed by the Candidate Eligibility Review Committee of the HKSAR according to opinions issued by the Committee for Safeguarding National Security of the Hong Kong Special Administrative Region. The	Chief Executive-designate is then returned by the Election Committee with an absolute majority.

Election Committee
The specific method for selecting the Chief Executive is prescribed in  Annex I of the Basic Law. The Election Committee shall be composed of 1500 members from the following sectors pursuant to the amended Annex I under the 2021 Hong Kong electoral changes initiated by the National People's Congress from the following sectors pursuant to the amended Annex I under the 2021 Hong Kong electoral changes initiated by the National People's Congress. The Election Committee consists of individuals (i.e. private citizens) and representatives of bodies (i.e. special interest groups or corporate bodies) selected or elected by 40 prescribed sub-sectors as stipulated in Annex I to the Basic Law:

The Election Committee is now principally elected by body votes. The number of subsectors with individual votes were significantly reduced, together with elimination of mixed individual and body voting:
 Half of seats (150 seats) in Sector III are nominated by members of national professional organisations or filled by ex officio members;
 District Council subsectors were  replaced by subsectors consisting of apppointed representatives of members of Area Committees, District Fight Crime Committees, and District Fire Safety Committees;
 All NPC and CPPCC sectors serve as ex officio EC members; and
 subsectors consisting of grassroot organisations, associations of Chinese Fellow Townsmen, associations of Hong Kong residents in Mainland and Hong Kong members of relevant national organisations were introduced.

Electoral system
Chief Executive candidates must receive nominations by at least 188 members of the Election Committee, with Nomination by at least 15 members of each sector of the Election Committee. Candidacy is confirmed upon review and confirmation of eligibility by the Candidate Qualification Review Committee, according to opinions issued by the Committee for Safeguarding National Security of the Hong Kong Special Administrative Region on the basis of a review by the National Security Department of the Hong Kong Police Force on whether a candidate meets the legal requirements and conditions of upholding the Basic Law and swearing allegiance to the HKSAR of the People's Republic of China.

The Chief Executive-designate is then returned by the Election Committee with an absolute majority in a two-round system:

The Chief Executive-designate must publicly disaffiliate with a political party within seven days of the election and must not become a member of a party during their term of office. The Chief Executive-designate is then appointed by the Central People's Government before taking office.

Article 45
Article 45 gives the requirements for choosing the Chief Executive, and Annex I does likewise in a more specific manner.

Article 46
According to Article 46 of the Hong Kong Basic Law, elections for the Chief Executive are held every five years. An 1,500-member electoral college called the Election Committee is elected by representations of specified associations, and some other sectors of the society, with each of the forty sectors of the society and interests of the Central Authorities receiving a set number of electoral votes. The eligible voters in each sector vote directly for the electors, who in turn cast ballots for Chief Executive.

Pursuant to the Annex II of the Basic Law, the Election Committee also selected 10 Members of the 1st LegCo by block vote in 1998. Four of the seats were reassigned to geographical constituencies for the 2nd LegCo in 2000, and the remainder for the 3rd LegCo in 2004. As a part of the 2021 amendments to Annex II by the Standing Committee of the National People's Congress, the Election Committee selects 40 members of the LegCo since 2021.

The EC elections are quite irregular. They were held in 1998 and 2000, but none (except for the 2002 by-election) have been held since. The claim in Ann. 1, Sect. 2, of the Basic Law, saying that the Election Committee must be renewed at least once every five years.

Article 46 was a subject of controversy regarding the term of the newly elected Chief Executive.  The article states:

The law requires a term of five years, but mainland officials have said the new leader filling-in can only serve until 2007.  The matter was settled after a re-interpretation by the Standing Committee of the National People's Congress (NPCSC).  Though this did damage the credibility and integrity of the one country, two systems formula.

A literal interpretation would mean Tsang has to serve until 2010, but this is not common sense behaviour in most other nations; one can only complete the term of a predecessor. The Chinese government has decided that the new leader would serve until Inauguration day in 2007.

History of electoral contests
The last uncontested election was held in 2002, and with the resignation of Tung Chee Hwa an election would have been called on 10 July, had the election been contested. A controversial decision by the National People's Congress stated that a resignation did not end a term, so that Donald Tsang would serve only until 2007, rather than 2010 had a term been deemed to begin with each resignation. This is in line with the practice on mainland China (see Hong Kong Basic Law Article 46). The 800-member Election Committee held a vote on a day specified by the sitting chief executive sometime during the six months of the year prior to the HKSAR's Inauguration Day, 1 July. An absolute majority of the votes (i.e. 401 votes) are required to be elected. If no candidate has a majority vote, the one with the lowest vote is eliminated for the next round until a candidate has a majority vote.

In 1996, Tung Chee Hwa was elected with eighty per cent of the electoral votes against two other candidates, Mr. Peter Woo and Sir Ti Liang Yang. In 12002, Tung was re-elected uncontested, as he had received 713 signatures of support in the Electoral Committee, and 100 are required for nomination.(Annex I, Section 4, Basic Law)

The 2005 provided a sense of déjà vu for many, as Donald Tsang cruised to victory with 674 nomination signatures out of a possible 796 (four seats were vacant).

The EC elections are quite irregular. They were held in 1998 and 2000, but none (except for the 2002 by-election) have been held since. The claim in Ann. 1, Sect. 2, of the Basic Law, saying that the Election Committee must be renewed at least once every five years, exposed an interesting flaw in the system that was averted when Tsang was the only candidate nominated.

The problem was that the timing is crucial for the new chief executive election after Tung Chee Hwa's resignation on 12 March 2005. Since electoral law states that an election must be held 120 days after the vacancy, an election would be held on the tenth of July. It was unclear as to the exact time period separating the election and the date of taking of office for this Election Committee. If the new EC convened prior to the chief executive election, it would be applied to select the next chief executive, but otherwise the old Election Committee dating from 2000 would have to complete the task (see 2005 Hong Kong Chief Executive election for more information on the topic). The second round produces a further dispute, if the term of the old EC ended after the first round of voting but before the second. It would be rather insensible to use different electors for the two rounds; the same one would probably have to be prescribed.

The compositions of electoral colleges returning Chief Executives are as follows:

Legislative elections

Under the 2021 Hong Kong electoral changes initiated by the National People's Congress, the Legislative Council is now composed of 90 members returned from 3 constituencies: the Election Committee Constituency, Functional Constituencies and Geographical Constituencies by popular vote.

In Hong Kong, legislative elections are held every four years in accordance with Article 69 of the Basic Law of HKSAR. The  most recent election was held on 19 December 2021.

Electoral system
Each candidate running for Legislative elections is to be nominated by 10–20 members of the Election Committee, before their eligibility is reviewed and confirmed by the Candidate Eligibility Review Committee of the HKSAR according to opinions issued by the Committee for Safeguarding National Security of the Hong Kong Special Administrative Region:

Geographical Constituencies

20 seats of the Legislative Council are returned by geographical constituencies (GC) through single non-transferable vote with a district magnitude of 2 ("binomial system"). The binomial system was instituted by the Standing Committee of the National People's Congress in its amendment to Annex 2 of the Basic Law on 30 March 2021.

Geographical constituencies were first introduced in Hong Kong's first legislative election with direct elections in 1991. The electoral system and boundaries of GCs have since changed:

Functional Constituencies

Under the 2021 Hong Kong electoral changes, 28 functional constituencies (FC) return 30 members. The Labour Functional Constituency returns three members by plurality block voting. The other FCs return one member each with first-past-the-post voting.

The 2021 electoral reform saw the dissolution of District Council (First) and District Council (Second) FCs. 3 existing FCs were reconstituted: the Information Technology FC reorganised as the Technology & Innovation FC; the Medical FC and Health Services FC combined to form the Medical and Health Services FC. 2 new FCs were established, namely the Commercial (Third) and the HKSAR Deputies to the National People's Congress, HKSAR Members of the National Committee of the Chinese People's Political Consultative Conference, and Representatives of Relevant National Organisations FCs. Functional constituencies are now principally elected by body votes; the number of FCs with individual votes were reduced, together with elimination of mixed individual and body voting systems.

Election Committee Constituency

The Election Committee constituency was one of the three constituencies designed in the Basic Law of Hong Kong next to the directly elected geographical constituencies and the indirectly elected functional constituencies for the first and second-term  Legislative Council fin the early SAR period. With the last British Governor Chris Patten's electoral reform, the ECC was composed of all elected District Board members who had been elected in 1994. The Single Transferable Vote system was used in the 1995 election.

After the handover of Hong Kong, the ECC was allocated 10 seats out of the total 60 seats in the SAR Legislative Council, comprising all members of the Election Committee which also elected the Chief Executive every five years. The size of the constituency reduced to six seats in 2000 and was entirely abolished and replaced by the directly elected geographical constituency seats in the 2004 election. The plurality-at-large voting system was used in 1998 and 2000.

In the 2021 electoral overhaul, the Election Committee constituency was reintroduced, taking 40 of the 90 seats, almost half, of the Legislative Council with plurality-at-large voting system. The electorate is composed of all newly expanded 1,500 members in the Election Committee.

2010 electoral reform 

The Legislative Council passed the Government's bill on amending Annex II of the Basic Law. The total number of Legislative Council members is increased from 60 to 70. Alongside the creation of five new geographical constituency seats, five new functional constituency seats were created in the District Council (Second) FC. The 5 new FC seats were returned by direct elections through proportional representation using the largest remainder method with Hare quota.

The 2010 electoral reform provides for parallel voting, in which each registered voter can participate in the elections of one geographical constituency and one functional constituency.

The District Council (Second) FC was abolished by the National People's Congress under the 2021 Hong Kong electoral changes.

2012 by-election procedure amendment proposal 

In mid-May 2011, the government, which considered the resignations leading to "de facto referendum" (2010 Hong Kong by-election) 'abusive' and a waste of resources, revealed its plan to do away with by-elections entirely. Secretary for Constitutional and Mainland Affairs Stephen Lam proposed that a Legislative Council seat in any geographical constituency or one of the newly created five-seat district council 'superconstituency' vacated by the resignation or death of a legislator would be filled by a 'leapfrog' mechanism by the next best placed candidate at the previous election. The plan attracted criticism from Pan-Democrats; even its allies in the legislature expressed reservations about the workability of the plan. The Bar Association severely criticised the plan, expressing concern over the constitutionality of the proposals, particularly the reasonableness on restrictions on the right to participation.

The government tabled a bill to amend current legislation for by-elections for 13 July. Following call by the Central Government Liaison Office to re-think, the government revised its proposal on 28 June stipulating replacement by an unsuccessful candidate on the same election ticket. The government bowed to pressure and announced one week later that it would suspend reading of the bill for two months, pending consultations on the revised proposals.

Electoral performances by party

District Council elections

There are eighteen districts, and thus eighteen District Councils in Hong Kong, each being a city council for its district. There is one constituency for, on average, every 17,000 residents, as there are 452 constituencies for 2019, and over 7.4 million residents in Hong Kong. A member is elected from each constituency by the first-past-the-post system. The chairpersons of the 27 rural committees are ex officio members of the councils. comprising 479 members

Elections of deputies to the National People's Congress of the PRC
Article 21 of The Basic Law of HKSAR stipulates:

Chinese citizens who are residents of the Hong Kong Special Administrative Region shall be entitled to participate in the management of state affairs according to law.

In accordance with the assigned number of seats and the selection method specified by the National People's Congress (NPC), Chinese citizens among permanent residents of the Hong Kong Special Administrative Region shall locally elect deputies of the Region to the National People's Congress to participate in the work of the highest organ of state power.

The 36 Hong Kong deputies to the National People's Congress are chosen by an electoral college composed of the following as specified in the Method for Election of Deputies of the Hong Kong Special Administrative Region of the People’s Republic of China to the Eleventh National People’s Congress passed in March 2022:
 Members of the Election Committee (which elects the chief executive) who are Chinese nationals, except those who opt out; and
 The Chief Executive of the HKSAR

A total of 1,989 electors returned Hong Kong deputies in the 2017 election.

Village Representative elections 
Rural Representatives consist of Village Representatives and Kaifong Representatives.

The Court of Final Appeal ruled that the Secretary for Home Affairs had to consider whether the person elected to represent a village was elected in accordance with electoral arrangements consistent with the Bill of Rights and the Sex Discrimination Ordinance whether to approve an elected Village Representative in December 2000. This decision caused Hong Kong Government to set up new arrangements for Village Representative. There are two types of Village Representatives, namely
 Indigenous Inhabitant Representative representing indigenous inhabitants of an Indigenous Village; and
 Resident Representative representing all residents of an Existing Village

Indigenous Inhabitant of an Indigenous Village that existed in 1898 (whether or not the name the Village now has is the same name it had in 1898) refers to:
 a person who was in 1898 a resident of the Village; or
 a person who is descended through the male line from a person mentioned above.

In 2013, the new Village Representative Election Ordinance has been implemented that the Kaifong Representatives from Cheung Chau and Peng Chau are regulated by the Home Affairs Department. The first new arrangements Village Representative elections was held in 2019. The next Village Representative elections would be held in 2023.

Electoral results

Legends
：Pro-democracy Camp
：Pro-Beijing Camp
：non-aligned and others

Latest elections

2019 District Council election

2021 Legislative election

2022 Chief executive election

See also
 Electoral calendar (global)
 Politics of Hong Kong
 List of constituencies of Hong Kong
 2010 Hong Kong electoral reform
 2014–15 Hong Kong electoral reform
 2021 Hong Kong electoral reform

Notes

References

External links
Hong Kong Government Website
Adam Carr's Election Archive
Elections in Hong Kong/ Roland Nicholson, Jr.
Previous election results by Lingnan University
The Electoral System, Hong Kong 2003 – Constitution and Administration, Government of Hong Kong
Web Site of the Electoral Affairs Commission

 
Politics of Hong Kong